Stunts (also known as 4D Sports Driving) is a 3D racing video game developed by Distinctive Software and published by Broderbund in 1990. The game places emphasis on racing on stunt tracks and features a track editor. It is clearly influenced by the earlier arcade game Hard Drivin' and has many similar elements to the game Stunt Driver which was released the same year. The game is part of the 4D Sports series along with 4D Sports Tennis and 4D Sports Boxing.

Gameplay

In Stunts, players race a lap around the circuit, with the aim of completing the lap as quickly as possible without crashing. These laps often feature special track areas such as loops, jumps (including over tall buildings), slalom roads and corkscrews. The game area is restricted by a large fixed size square area defined and surrounded by a fence in which the game is designed to prevent the player from leaving. Players can either race against the clock or choose between six different opponents; there is no support for real-time multiplayer. Stunts features 11 different drivable cars, with either automatic or manual transmission. Replays of races can be saved and reviewed. There are four camera views available during replay and actual driving, and the dashboard is an optional overlay on all views. It is also possible to continue the race from any point in the replay, but the time for that race will not be recorded. Another major feature of the game is the built-in track and terrain editor which allows the user to design arbitrary new tracks or modifications of existing tracks.

The cars can drive on paved roads, gravel roads, icy/snow roads, and grass if driving off the track — which all offer different levels of grip. The game has a relatively advanced pseudo-physics engine for its time which can simulate oversteer and understeer; the grip is also proportional to the banking of a curve. The game features a 3D engine with flat shading and no textures, it uses polygonal graphics for most objects, including trees and road signs, there are few sprites. The resolution is 320×200 with 256 colors. There is an option to select high and low detail. The game is written for DOS and executes in real mode.

Stunts includes a form of copy protection. Each time after running the program, players must complete a specific phrase found in the game manual before being allowed to race. If the player fails to complete the phrase three times, the next race will still load. However, approximately four seconds into the race, the player is informed that they did not deactivate the car's security system, the car crashes, and the player is returned to the main menu.

Release
The game was originally made for the IBM PC compatibles and then ported for Amiga, FM Towns and NEC PC-9801.

Stunts version 1.0 was published by Broderbund in October 1990 for the United States. A year later the version 1.1 was developed, which fixed some bugs. This version was again released by Broderbund for the United States, and was also published by Mindscape for the European market.

The Mindscape release had the title changed to 4D Sports Driving, to make the game a part of their 4D Sports brand (the other games of the line were 4D Sports Boxing and 4D Sports Tennis). Some minor game engine differences exists between Stunts 1.1 version and 4D Sports Driving 1.1 version, like driving through tunnel roofs in Mindscape version, while you crash on the roof in Broderbund version

The Amiga version was published in 1992 by Mindscape under the name 4D Sports Driving (version 1.2). SFX and music are played with sampler instead of FM synthesis or PC speaker. 

The PC-9801 version was titled 4D Driving (version 1.0) and was published by Electronic Arts Victor in 1993. Due to PC-9801 limitations, this version had the music synthesized and title and menu graphics changed from the previous platform's releases, although the gameplay remained mainly the same.

FM Towns version is also named 4D Driving (version 1.0) and was also published by Electronic Arts Victor in 1993. Due to FM Towns capacities, music has been changed and improved, and new songs added. Title page and menu graphics are also modified, close to PC-9801 version but with better graphics. In FM Towns version, the opponent's photos has been changed, and Bernie Rubber character is replaced by Masahiko, a Japanese guy. His dedicated track remains the same as Bernie's track.

Reception
In 1994, PC Gamer US named Stunts the 22nd best computer game ever. The editors wrote "The sense of speed, and the degree of control you have over your vehicle, make this a must for every gamer".

See also
 Hard Drivin' (1989)
 Stunt Car Racer (1989)
 Stunt Driver (1990)

References

External links
 
 
 The Stunts Racing Portal
 Stunts GameBytes review
 StuntsTools from dstien
 Report about the Stunts community from April 2017
 Ultimate Stunts - A remake of Stunts

1990 video games
Amiga games
Broderbund games
DOS games
FM Towns games
NEC PC-9801 games
Racing video games
Video games developed in Canada
Video games scored by Jeff van Dyck
Video games with user-generated gameplay content
Mindscape games
Distinctive Software games
Single-player video games